Naikheri railway station is a small railway station in Ujjain district, Madhya Pradesh. Its code is NKI. It serves Naikheri village.

Infrastructure
The station consists of two platforms.

See also
 Ujjain Junction railway station

References

External links

Railway stations in Ujjain district
Ratlam railway division